The Ministry of Justice of Gabon is responsible for the following duties:

 Ensuring the application of any laws and regulations in accordance with the texts in force
 Ensuring the proper functioning of the jurisdictions under the ministry’s control (e.g., expenses)
 Overseeing the operations of the Judicial Police

List of ministers (Mainly post-1960 upon achieving independence) 

Vincent de Paul Nyonda (1963-1964)
Paul Marie Yembit (1964-1966)
Augustin Boumah (1967)
Samuel Minko (1968)
Eugene Amogho (1968)
Jerome Okinda (1969)
Andre Mintsa (1970)
Léon Mébiame (1970-1971)
Jean-Remy Ayoune (1971-1972)
Valentin Obame (1972-1974)
Jacques Igoho (1974-1976)
Raphael Mamiaka (1976-1978)
Jules Bourdes Ogouliguende (1978-1980)
 Theodore Kwaou (1980-1981)
Edouard-Alexis Mbouy-Boutzit (1981-1983)
 Georges Nkoma (1983-1986)
Sophie Diouly (née Ngwamassana) (1987-1989) [1st woman]
 Sylvestre Oyonomi (1989-1990)
 Michel Anchouey (1991)
 Serge Mba-Bekale (1991-1994)
 Pierre-Louis Okawe (1994-2000)
 Pascal Desire Missongo (2001-2002)
 Honorine Dossou Naki (2002-2008)
 Martin Mabala (2008-2012)
 Ida Reteno Assounouet (2012-2014)
 Séraphin Moundounga (2014-September 2016)
 Francis Nkéa Ndzigue (...-February 2018)
 Edgard Anicet Mboumbou Miyakou (February 2018-December 2019-)
 Erlyne Antonella Ndembet (December 2019-present)

See also 

 Justice ministry
 Politics of Gabon

References 

Justice ministries
Government of Gabon